Pachyceramyia robusta is a species of house fly the family Muscidae.

References

Further reading

External links

 

Muscidae
Insects described in 1917